Silvana Roth (also known as Silvana Maria Rota, February 17, 1924 – April 3, 2010) was an Argentine stage and film actress. A star of the Golden Age of Argentine Cinema, she appeared in twenty six films between 1940 and 1971. Sources differ over her place of birth, with some saying Genoa in Italy and others Buenos Aires.

Politically Roth was a staunch Peronist. She served in the Argentine Chamber of Deputies between 1973 and 1976 before being ousted after the coup that year.
She was one of the delegates to the International Women's Year World Conference on Women in 1975.

Selected filmography
 Melodies of America (1941)
 Sweethearts for the Girls (1941)
 Seven Women (1944)
 Back in the Seventies (1945)
 School of Champions (1950)

References

Bibliography 
 Melgosa, Adrián Pérez. Cinema and Inter-American Relations: Tracking Transnational Affect. Routledge, 2012.

External links 
 

1924 births
2010 deaths
Argentine film actresses
20th-century Argentine actresses
Actresses from Buenos Aires
Roth
Italian emigrants to Argentina